A sandpit is a low, wide container or shallow depression filled with soft (beach) sand in which children can play.

Sandpit may also refer to:

Places
Sandpit, County Louth, a village in Ireland
The Sandpit, an area of Horsell Common, Surrey, England
Sandpits, a Major Residential Area in Westside, Gibraltar

Music
"Sandpit", a 1992 song by Curve from Doppelgänger
"Sandpit", a 2019 song by Scorcher

Books and plays
The Sandpit: Womensis, a 1990 play by K. S. Maniam
"The Sandpit", a poem in the 1984 collection Station Island by Seamus Heaney
The Sandpit, a 2020 novel by Nicholas Shakespeare

Other uses
Sandpit (horse) (1989–2003), a Brazilian Thoroughbred racehorse
Wollongong Entertainment Centre or The Sandpit
Sand pit, an open-pit sand mine
The Sandpit, a painting by Willem de Zwart
 or The Sandpit, a 2008 documentary by Sebastián Sepúlveda

See also
Quarry, an open-pit mine used for excavating various materials, including sand
Sandbox (disambiguation)
Sandspit (disambiguation)